The dabbawalas (also spelled dabbawallas or dabbawallahs, called tiffin wallahs in older sources) constitute a lunchbox delivery and return system that delivers hot lunches from homes and restaurants to people at work in India, especially in Mumbai. The lunchboxes are picked up in the late morning, delivered predominantly using bicycles and railway trains, and returned empty in the afternoon.

Origins 
In the late 1800s, an increasing number of migrants were moving to Bombay from different parts of the country, and fast food and canteens were not prevalent. All these people left early in the morning for offices, and often had to go hungry for lunch. They belonged to different communities, and therefore had different types of tastes, which could only be satisfied by their own home-cooked meals. So, in 1890, Mahadeo Havaji Bachche started a lunch delivery service in Bombay with about a hundred men. This proved to be successful, and the service grew from there. In 1930, he informally attempted to unionize the dabbawalas. Later, a charitable trust was registered in 1956 under the name of Nutan Mumbai Tiffin Box Suppliers Trust. The commercial arm of this trust was registered in 1968 as Mumbai Tiffin Box Suppliers Association.

Etymology 
When literally translated, the word "dabbawala" means "one who carries a box". An English translation would be "tiffin box delivery man".

Colour-coding system

Lunch boxes are marked in several ways:
 Abbreviations for collection points
 Colour code for starting station
 Number for destination station
 Markings for handling dabbawala at destination, building and floor

A colour-coding system identifies the destination and recipient. Each dabbawala is required to contribute a minimum capital in kind, in the form of two bicycles, a wooden crate for the tiffins, white cotton kurta-pyjamas, and the white Gandhi cap (topi). Each month there is a division of the earnings of each unit. Fines are imposed for alcohol, tobacco, being out of uniform, and absenteeism.

A collecting dabbawala, usually on bicycle, collects dabbas either from a worker's home or from the dabba makers. As many of the carriers are of limited literacy (the average literacy of Dabbawallahs is that of 8th grade), the dabbas (boxes) have some sort of distinguishing mark on them, such as a colour or group of symbols.

The dabbawala then takes them to a sorting place, where he and other collecting dabbawalas sort the lunch boxes into groups. The grouped boxes are put in the coaches of trains, with markings to identify the destination of the box (usually there is a designated car for the boxes). The markings include the railway station to unload the boxes and the destination building delivery address. Some modern infrastructure improvements such as the Navi Mumbai Metro are not used in the supply chain, as cabins do not have the capacity for hundreds of tiffins.

At each station, boxes are handed over to a local dabbawala, who delivers them. The empty boxes are collected after lunch or the next day and sent back to the respective houses. The dabbawalas also allow for delivery requests through SMS.

Ethnicity

Most dabbawalas are related to each other, belong to the Varkari sect of Maharashtra, and come from the same small village near Pune. Tiffin distribution is suspended for five days each March as the dabbawalas go home for the annual village festival.

Dabbawalas have traditionally been male, but as of 2013, a few women had begun joining the profession. A dabbawala can be either a foreman, mukadam, or a simple delivery man, gaddi. Typically, they begin between the ages of 15 and 20. While they take pride in their freedom and the fact that they work in a network of their relatives, the relatively low compensation provided for their physical exertion makes them discourage their own children from joining the profession.

In a typical day, a dabbawala picks up tiffins every morning and then sorts them once before they are loaded onto the morning train (at approximately 10a.m.). The tiffins are sorted another time in the luggage compartment of the train. At the destination station, the tiffins are loaded into carts and deposited in stacks at the entrances of the various workplaces. Following lunch, the same procedure is carried out in the reverse order with the empty tiffins.

Association 
The earliest meetings of the Mumbai Tiffin Box Suppliers Association were held in the open air. They took up premises in 1943 and settled the headquarters at Dadar in 1962. Located on the first floor of a building, the premises consist of a large, simply furnished room. A large mirrored painting of Saint Dnyaneshwar with Vithoba adorns one corner. Other portraits adorning the room include those of Bal Gangadhar Tilak and the founder of the association, Mahadeo Havaji Bachche.

The association was reportedly started after a dabbawalla was ill-treated by a customer, resulting in the dabbawallas deciding to form a "united front" while dealing with injustices or difficulties, such as funerals. The association also helps with managing legal issues, including conflicts between mukadams and gaddis. All conflicts are resolved in the presence of 20 mukadams, which are selected every six years.

The charitable Nutan Mumbai Tiffin Box Suppliers Trust consists of nine members who are elected every five years. Its main role is to collect funds for dharamshalas.

Economic analysis

Each dabbawala, regardless of role, is paid around 8,000 rupees per month (about US$131 in 2014). Between 175,000 and 200,000 lunch boxes are moved each day by 4,500 to 5,000 dabbawalas. Tiffin-wallahs are self-employed. The union initiation fee is 30,000 rupees, which guarantees a 5,000-rupee monthly income and a job for life. The 150 rupee a month fee provides for delivery six days a week. (2002)

It is frequently claimed that dabbawalas make less than one mistake in every six million deliveries; however, this is only an estimation from Ragunath Medge, the president of the Mumbai Tiffinmen's Association in 1998, and is not from a rigorous study. Medge told Subrata Chakravarty, the lead author of the "Fast Food" article by Forbes where this claim first appeared, that dabbawalas make a mistake "almost never, maybe once every two months" and this statement was extrapolated by Subrata Chakravarty to be a rate of "one mistake in 8 million deliveries." Chakravarty recalled the affair in an interview and said:

The New York Times reported in 2007 that the 125-year-old dabbawala industry continues to grow at a rate of 5–10% per year.

Studies  
Various studies have focused on dabbawalas: 
 In 2001, Pawan G. Agrawal carried out his PhD research in "A Study & Logistics & Supply Chain Management of Dabbawala in Mumbai". He presented his results on the efficiency of Dabbawallas in various fora.
 In 2005, the Indian Institute of Management (Ahmedabad) featured a case study on the Mumbai Dabbawallas from a management perspective of logistics.
 In 2010, Harvard Business School added the case study The Dabbawala System: On-Time Delivery, Every Time to their compendium for its high level of service with a low-cost and simple operating system.
 In 2014, Uma S. Krishnan completed her PhD research in "A Cross-Cultural Study of the Literacy Practices of The Dabbawalas: Towards a New Understanding of Non-mainstream Literacy and its Impact on Successful Business Practices."

Notable events 

 Dabbawallas were invited to the wedding of Prince Charles and Camilla Parker Bowles in 2005.
As of 2010, the dabbawallas were chosen by Bharti Airtel to distribute advertising pamphlets, with a commission for every dabbawalla.
On 21 March 2011, Prakash Baly Bachche carried three dabbawalla tiffin crates on his head at one time, which was entered as a Guinness World Record.
 In 2011, dabbawalas went on strike for the first time in 120 years to promote and attend a rally at Azad Maidan to support Anna Hazare as part of the 2011 Indian anti-corruption movement.
Over the years, the dabbawallas have been visited by many prominent personalities like Charles, Prince of Wales, Richard Branson and then US Commerce Secretary, Gary Locke.

In popular culture
The 2013 Bollywood film The Lunchbox is based on the dabbawala service.

The Top Gear: India Special, a special episode of the British TV series Top Gear, had the presenters Jeremy Clarkson, Richard Hammond and James May attempting to outdo the dabbawalas in efficiency and accuracy, by delivering the lunches with their cars, rather than by train and bicycle.

References

Further reading

External links 

 

Indian cuisine
Culture of Mumbai
Transport occupations
Personal care and service occupations
Transport in Mumbai
Indian slang
Indian English idioms